As of 2023, Cyprus is going through a major construction phase that first began in late 2013 when legislation passed encouraging construction. Ever since then, hundreds of new housing units and mushrooming businesses have been, and are still being, introduced to the Cyprus each year. The construction industry in Cyprus accounts for 7% of the country's GDP.

Currently, there are about 60 buildings that are proposed and/or under construction that will stand taller than 50m upon completion, out of which about the half of them are skyscrapers. The recently completed One high-rise residential building is the tallest tower in Cyprus, the tallest seafront residential building in Europe and amongst the 100 tallest buildings in the European Union. Amongst the recently completed projects is the 'City of Dreams Mediterranean' which is European Union's largest casino resort.

Tallest buildings in Cyprus 
The following lists rank all skyscrapers and high-rise buildings in Cyprus, standing at least 100 metres (328 ft) and at least 50 metres (164 ft) tall, respectively.

Skyscrapers (≥100 meters)

High-Rise Buildings (50-100 meters)

Tallest building history

Tallest building by usage 
The list below denotes the tallest buildings by their usage. Buildings with multiple usages aren't listed.

Tallest building by city 
The list below denotes the tallest building per city.

Buildings under construction 
This list denotes buildings that are under construction or that have been proposed in Cyprus, and are planned to rise at least 50 metres.

Under Construction: 16 (11 skyscrapers, 5 high-rise buildings)

Approved: 24 (6 skyscrapers, 18 high-rise buildings)

Proposed: 18 (7 skyscrapers, 11 high-rise buildings)

Total: 58 (24 skyscrapers, 34 high-rise buildings)

Tallest structures 
The following is a list of all structures in Cyprus, other than buildings, with a height greater than 100 meters. A structure differs from a high-rise by its lack of floors and habitability.

See also 
List of tallest buildings in Europe
List of tallest buildings in the world
List of tallest buildings in Malta
List of tallest buildings in Israel

References 

Tallest
Cyprus
Skyscrapers in Cyprus
Cyprus